Tennessee's 25th Senate district is one of 33 districts in the Tennessee Senate. It has been represented by Republican Kerry Roberts since his 2014 primary defeat of fellow Republican Jim Summerville; prior to redistricting, Roberts had represented the 18th district.

Geography
District 25 is based in the rural and suburban areas to the west of Nashville, covering all of Cheatham, Dickson, Hickman, Humphreys, and Robertson Counties. Communities in the district include Springfield, Dickson, Ashland City, Waverly, Greenbrier, Coopertown, Centerville, Pleasant View, White Bluff, and parts of White House, Portland, and Millersville.

The district overlaps with Tennessee's 5th, 6th, and 7th congressional districts, and with the 66th, 69th, 74th, and 78th districts of the Tennessee House of Representatives. It borders the state of Kentucky.

Recent election results
Tennessee Senators are elected to staggered four-year terms, with odd-numbered districts holding elections in midterm years and even-numbered districts holding elections in presidential years.

2018

2014

Federal and statewide results in District 25

References 

25
Cheatham County, Tennessee
Dickson County, Tennessee
Hickman County, Tennessee
Humphreys County, Tennessee
Robertson County, Tennessee